George F. Ward (born 1945) is a former United States Ambassador to Namibia.

Education
Ward earned a BA degree in history from the University of Rochester and an MPA degree from Harvard University.

Other diplomatic posts
1989 – 1992: Deputy chief of the U.S. mission in Bonn

References

Living people
Ambassadors of the United States to Namibia
Harvard Kennedy School alumni
University of Rochester alumni
1945 births
20th-century American diplomats